Classic trials, or colloquially mud plugging, is one of the oldest forms of rallying or off-road motor sports, dating from the beginning of the 20th century. Originally, the challenge was just to complete a long (challenging) road course. All three Motor Cycling Club long distance trials in the UK – the Land's End, the Exeter and the Edinburgh – date from that time, and are still held today.

As vehicles became more reliable, the events became easier and the concept of observed non-stop sections was introduced. On these, the car or motorcycle is stopped at the foot of a hill and has to make a non-stop ascent.

On a classic trial today, there will typically be around fifteen of such "observed sections", mixed with between 40 to 400 miles of road course.

Specific forms of car trials are PCTs (production car trials), for (road legal) production cars with minimal modification, and on the other hand sporting trials for special "flyweight" vehicles. These trials are restricted to one off-road trial route, without any road mileage sections.

External links
Classical Gas — Classic Trialling
Association of Classic Trials Clubs — Rules and Regulations for one day Classic Trials and an article on the history of the sport.
The Motor Cycling Club — Despite the name the MCC organise the three overnight trials.

Auto racing by type